The Malaysia men's national under-21 field hockey team represents Malaysia in men's international under-21 field hockey competitions and is controlled by the Malaysian Hockey Confederation, the governing body for field hockey in Malaysia.

Tournament record

Junior World Cup

Junior Asia Cup

1988 – 4th place
1992 – 
1996 – 5th place
2000 – 
2004 – 4th place
2008 – 5th place
2012 – 
2015 – 5th place

Source:

Sultan of Johor Cup

2011 – 
2012 – 6th place
2013 – 
2014 – 5th place
2015 – 
2016 – 5th place
2017 – 4th place
2018 – 5th place
2019 – 
2022 – 6th place

Current squad

See also
Malaysia men's national field hockey team
Malaysia women's national under-21 field hockey team

References

Men's national under-21 field hockey teams